Anapaite is a calcium–iron phosphate mineral with formula: Ca2Fe2+(PO4)2·4H2O. It is a mineral that typically occurs in cavities in fossil bearing sedimentary rocks. It is also found in phosphate bearing iron ores and rarely in pegmatites. It is commonly found with goethite, siderite and vivianite.

It was named after the type locality on the Black Sea coastal region of Anapa, Taman Peninsula, Russia. Noted localities include Kertch (Crimea, Ukraine), Bellver de Cerdanya (Lleida, Catalonia, Spain) and Valdarno, Tuscany, Italy.

See also
 A list of minerals with associated Wikipedia articles
 List Viewing (in German)

References

Calcium minerals
Iron(II) minerals
Phosphate minerals